Conatus: Journal of Philosophy is a biannual peer-reviewed open-access academic journal of philosophy. It was established in 2016 by the Applied Philosophy Research Laboratory (Department of Philosophy, National and Kapodistrian University of Athens) in collaboration with the Greek National Documentation Centre. It publishes original philosophical articles on theoretical and applied issues. The founder and current editor-in-chief is Evangelos D. Protopapadakis (National and Kapodistrian University of Athens).

Abstracting and indexing
The journal is abstracted and indexed in Scopus and EBSCO databases.

Article categories
The journal publishes original research articles, critical discussions, book reviews, and letters to the editor.

References

External links

Publications established in 2016
Biannual journals
English-language journals
Creative Commons Attribution-licensed journals
Philosophy journals
National and Kapodistrian University of Athens